Sandy Stone may refer to:

 Sandy Stone (artist) (born 1936), American author and artist
 Sandy Stone (character), a character created by Barry Humphries